Located in Norwood, Ohio, the Norwood Assembly Plant built General Motors cars between the years of 1923 and 1987.  When it first opened, the plant employed 600 workers and was capable of producing 200 cars per day.  At its peak in the early 1970s it employed nearly 9,000. Norwood is a suburb of Cincinnati.

The first car rolled off the assembly line on August 13, 1923, a Chevrolet Superior. Among the cars built at Norwood were the Chevrolet Bel Air, Biscayne, Impala, Nova, Caprice, Camaro, Pontiac Firebird, and the Buick Apollo.

The facility had a number of labor disputes, including a 174-day-long strike in 1972, at the time the longest strike in GM history.  As a result of the strike, 1,100 partially completed cars were scrapped or otherwise disposed of because it was not economically feasible to update them to the more stringent 1973 vehicle standards.  After the strike GM opted to move Nova production away from Norwood to protect the model from future labor problems.

Closing
While newer GM plants had a one-story design, the Norwood plant had a less efficient three-story design.  Additionally, the plant could not expand outward as it was surrounded by an interstate highway to the north, railroad lines to the east and west, a business district on a State Route to the west and a residential neighborhood to the south.

Citing its obsolescence, expense, and high worker absentee rate, GM announced on November 6, 1986, that the Norwood Assembly Plant would be closed along with ten other GM facilities.  The plant produced its last vehicle on August 26, 1987, a Chevrolet Camaro.  That date came to be known in Norwood as Black Wednesday.  At the time of its closing the plant employed approximately 4,200 workers. Most of the plant was demolished in 1989.  The main factory building sat vacant for nearly 10 years. The City of Norwood, having relied on the carmaker for nearly 35 percent of its taxbase, faced economic catastrophe and possible bankruptcy. The City wished to re-develop the site due to its unique and attractive location - at the juncture of Ohio State Route 562 (Norwood Lateral Expressway), U.S. Route 22 (Montgomery Road/Ohio State Route 3) and Ohio State Route 561 (Smith Road). Easily accessible from all directions, Norwood saw an opportunity to revitalize itself. Norwood approached GM about demolishing the plant. Initially the carmaker refused.

As its finances grew critical, Norwood threatened General Motors with a lawsuit. Apparently, Norwood had not been collecting taxes on earnings paid to workers on sick-leave or injury-leave since the factory opened in 1923. Only regular payroll taxes were collected. Norwood calculated uncollected taxes as being in the millions of dollars. The carmaker and City settled their dispute, with the site being demolished at the carmaker's expense. The property was turned over to the City for development in exchange for the City dropping its demand for back-taxes. The development of the GM Assembly site helped jump-start Norwood's economy.
A series of "flex" businesses were constructed. Where once had stood a single blue-collar car factory, the property was transformed into a mixed-use combination of business - office, light industrial and retail, providing mix-use income to the City.

As of spring 2007 the only remnants of former GM buildings were two parking garages. Those were absorbed into a new office complex along Smith Road (State Rte. 561), with additions of an adult gym/workout center, day-care center, restaurants, banking center and several medium and small businesses. One small street, formerly leading into the GM plant from Montgomery Road (U.S. Route 22), was closed and developed into a mixed use complex named after a major tenant Matrixx Marketing and later Convergys Corporation complex. It has been home to those businesses as well as a bank, satellite television provider and medical consulting/MRI/diagnostic laboratory.

There was also a railcar holding lot and loading area off Tennessee Ave. where the present day Harley-Davidson dealership is located. The rail spur itself is directly behind and up on the hill behind the Harley-Davidson dealership along the old B&O line. As of 2012 the loading area is still there complete with the loading ramps. However this area is becoming quickly overgrown with trees and bushes and it is difficult to tell it's even there anymore. Many of the rails still exist as well as the light poles. The driveway up the hill from the holding lot was removed when the Harley dealer was built.

As of Fall, 2007, the third and last piece of usable land from the GM plant at the corner of Montgomery Road (U.S. Route 22) and Smith Road (State Route 561) was developed with plans for a medical arts building.

The successful development of those former GM Assembly properties spurred interest by other developers to choose Norwood for commercial development. One mile away, two open-air shopping malls were built at the former R. K. LeBlond Machine Tool Company, located where Interstate 71 and Ohio State Rte 561 (Edwards Road) converge. Those properties were named Rookwood Pavilion and Rookwood Commons and have been very successful as well.

Economic impact
The plant constituted 35% of the City of Norwood's tax base, approximately $2 million annually. As a result, many city services were reduced and eliminated, and property tax rates raised. The plant employed 430 Norwood residents at the time of its closing, with the remaining employees mostly living in and around the Cincinnati area.

Models
Some of the models produced at the plant included:
1915-1922 Chevrolet Series 490
1923-1926 Chevrolet Superior (introduction of GM "A" platform)
1927 Chevrolet Series AA Capitol
1928 Chevrolet Series AB National
1929 Chevrolet Series AC International
1930 Chevrolet Series AD Universal
1931 Chevrolet Series AE Independence
1932 Chevrolet Series BA Confederate
1933 Chevrolet Eagle
1933-1942 Chevrolet Master
1941-1952 Chevrolet Deluxe
1953-1957 Chevrolet 150/Chevrolet 210/Chevrolet Fleetline/Chevrolet Townsman

References

 
 Cincinnati Enqirer (January 29, 2006). Norwood's fight for survival; Ford's plan to close its Batavia plant recalls the plight of local GM autoworkers in 1987.

General Motors factories
Former motor vehicle assembly plants
Motor vehicle assembly plants in Ohio
Norwood, Ohio
Buildings and structures in Hamilton County, Ohio
1923 establishments in Ohio